was a Japanese bank founded in Yokohama, Japan in the year 1880.  Its assets were transferred to The Bank of Tokyo (now MUFG Bank) in 1946.  The bank played a significant role in Japanese overseas trade, especially with China.  The original bank building is now the Kanagawa Prefectural Museum of Cultural History.

Background
Following the signing of the Treaty of Amity and Commerce in 1859, Yokohama was opened as a port for foreign trade and quickly grew in importance. Through the New Currency Act of 1871, Japan adopted the gold standard along international lines, with 1 yen corresponding to 1.5g of pure gold. Silver coins were also issued for trade with Asian countries who favoured silver as a currency, thus establishing a de facto gold-silver standard.  However, inflation caused by the 1877 Satsuma Rebellion and the outflow of a large amount of silver due to increased imports, a large discrepancy arose between government-issued banknotes and specie coin. This became a source of trouble for the merchants in Yokohama, as specie rather than banknotes came to be demanded for foreign trade. On 28 February 1880, a syndicate of 22 people with the support of Fukuzawa Yukichi and Inoue Kaoru established a bank in accordance with the National Bank Act to ensure the availability of specie for the trading community. The bank had an initial capitalization of three million Yen, of which one million was invested by the Ministry of Finance. The bank was modeled after the Hongkong and Shanghai Banking Corporation, which had a great influence on Japan's overseas trade and foreign exchange at the time. A branch office was opened in Kobe later the same year.

In 1884 the bank was appointed by the Ministry of Finance to manage Japan's foreign exchange. A branch office in London was opened in December. In July 1887, the government promulgated the Yokohama Specie Bank Ordinance, which stipulated that branch offices be established everywhere that was regarded as important to Japanese foreign trade and authorized that an administrator from the Ministry of Finance would be assigned to monitor the bank's operations. This Ordinance was revised in 1889 to authorize the Japanese government to overrule any decision by its directors, and if deemed necessary, to replace the directors with others of its choosing.

A branch office was opened in Shanghai in 1893. This was the first of many offices which would eventually be established throughout China. In 1894 a branch was established in Bombay. With the Russo-Japanese War of 1904 to 1905, the Yokohama Specie Bank established branches in the Kwantung Leased Territory and served as paymaster for the Imperial Japanese Army. From 1906, under its 7th president, Takahashi Korekiyo the bank was permitted to issue its own banknotes for use in the Kwantung Leased Territory and in China. In July of the same year, Japan's first leased line telephone opened between the Bank of Japan and the Yokohama Specie Bank head office. In 1911, the bank signed an underwriting agreement with the Imperial Chinese Chunghwa Post for the establishment of a postal banking system in China. In the Taisho period, the Yokohama Specie Bank became one of the three major exchange banks in the world. The bank continued in its role as the paymaster for the Imperial Japanese Army during the Second Sino-Japanese War and Pacific War, assisted by its widespread branch office network. Its assets in New York and Honolulu were seized by the United States government in 1941. In 1946, following the surrender of Japan, the bank was officially merged with The Bank of Tokyo as part of anti-zaibatsu ordinances issued by the American occupation authorities. The bank was finally liquidated in 1963.

International expansion
 1880 - New York agency
 1881 - London sub-branch
 1884 - London sub-branch is upgraded to a full branch
 1893 - Shanghai branch (currently Industrial and Commercial Bank of China, Shanghai Branch)
 1894 - Bombay branch
 1909 - Dalian branch (currently: Bank of China, Dalian Branch)
 1910 - Beijing branch (currently: Zhongrong Group)
 1910 – Honolulu branch, architect Harry Livingston Kerr 
 1912 - Harbin branch(currently Heilongjiang Museum)
 1915 - Sydney branch
 1919 - Qingdao branch (currently Qingdao Bank of Qingdao Branch)
 1921 - Hankou branch (currently Hubei International Trust Investment Corporation)
 1924 - Vladivostok branch (currently Vladimir K. Arseniev Museum of Far East History)
 1925 - Mukden branch (currently Industrial and Commercial Bank of China Zhongshan Square Branch)
 1926 - Tianjin branch (currently Bank of China Tianjin Branch)

Miscellaneous

Gallery

Past presidents 
 First (December 1879 – July 1882) Nakamura Michita
 Second (July 1882 – January 1883) Ōno Mitsukage 
 Third (January 1883 – March 1883) Shirasu Taizō
 Fourth (March 1883 – March 1890) Hara Rokurō
 Fifth (1890 March – April 1897) Sonoda Kokichi
 Sixth (March 1897 – March 1906) Sōma Nagatane
 Seventh (March 1906 – June 1911) Takahashi Korekiyo
 8th (March 1911 – February 1913) Mishima Yatarō
 9th (February 1913 - September 1913) Mizumachi Kesaroku
 10th (September 1913 – March 1919) Junnosuke Inoue
 11th (March 1919 – March 1922) Kajihara Nakaji
 12th (March 1922 – September 1936) Kodama Kenji
 13th (September 1936 – March 1943) Toshikata Ōkubo
 14th (March 1943 – June 1945) Hideshige Kashiwagi
 15th (1945 June–July 1946) Shōji Arakawa
 16th (1946-June–December 1946), Itsuki Takada

See also
 HSBC
 Banque de l'Indochine
 Deutsch-Asiatische Bank
 Russo-Chinese Bank

References

Further reading
 Japanese banking: a History, 1859-1959 — by Norio Tamaki

External links
 
 Kanagawa Prefectural Museum of Cultural History
 The Yokohama Specie Bank Building – built in 1924 (No. 24, The Bund)
 Our Town: Yokohama Specie Bank Building
 Building’s corner entry even grander than most

Defunct banks of Japan
Companies based in Yokohama
Imperial Japanese Army
Military history of Japan during World War II
Banks established in 1880
Banks disestablished in 1946
Japanese companies established in 1880
1946 disestablishments in Japan
Mitsubishi UFJ Financial Group